Baroil Polita Union is a union parishad situated at Magura Sadar Upazila,  in Magura District, Khulna Division of Bangladesh. There are 21 villages and 16 mouzas in the union.

Villages
 Baroil Polita
 Vangura
 Sottobanpur
 Chandpur
 Par Polita
 Bijoykhali
 Jaliavita
 Bamondanga
 Dohorsinghra
 Chengrardanga
 Ramchandrapur
 Senerchar
 Nalnagar
 Char Batajor
 Dangachingra
 Batajor
 Digholkandi
 Monirampur
 Choto Joka
 Ramdargati
 Putia
 Boro Joka

References

External links
 

Unions of Khulna Division
Unions of Magura Sadar Upazila
Unions of Magura District